Andrew Kyle (born 1978) is a Northern Irish international lawn and indoor bowler.

Kyle bowls for County Antrim Bowling Club indoors and Larne Bowling Club outdoors and in 2016 represented a combined Irish team at the Bowls World Cup in Australia. In 2017, he won three medals at the European Bowls Championships.

He was selected as part of the Northern Ireland team for the 2018 Commonwealth Games on the Gold Coast in Queensland.

In 2019, he won the fours bronze medal at the Atlantic Bowls Championships.

References

1978 births
Living people
Male lawn bowls players from Northern Ireland
Bowls players at the 2018 Commonwealth Games
Commonwealth Games competitors for Northern Ireland
Bowls European Champions